When the Evening Bell Rings (German:Wenn die Abendglocken läuten) may refer to:

 When the Evening Bells Ring (1930 film), a German silent film directed by Hanns Beck-Gaden 
 When the Evening Bells Ring (1951 film), a West German film directed by Alfred Braun